Charles George Herbermann (8 December 1840 – 24 August 1916) was a German-American professor and historian.

Biography
Charles George Herbermann was born in Saerbeck near Münster, Westphalia, Prussia on 8 December 1840, the son of George Herbermann and Elizabeth Stipp. He arrived in the United States in 1851, and seven years later graduated at College of St. Francis Xavier, New York City. He was appointed professor of Latin language and Literature (1869-1914) and librarian (1873-1914) at the College of the City of New York. For more than 50 years, he was immersed amidst various issues involved with Catholicism.  He was president of the Catholic Club (1874–75) and of the United States Catholic Historical Society (1898–1913).  He became editor in chief of the Catholic Encyclopedia in 1905.  He translated Torfason's History of Vinland and wrote Business Life in Ancient Rome (1880).

He died at his home in Manhattan on 24 August 1916, and was buried at Calvary Cemetery in Queens.

References

External links
 

American lexicographers
American motivational writers
American historians
American Roman Catholics
1840 births
Herberman, Charles George
Laetare Medal recipients
19th-century American translators
German emigrants to the United States
Burials at Calvary Cemetery (Queens)
Contributors to the Catholic Encyclopedia